Saratovka is a rural locality (a selo) and the administrative center of Saratovsky Selsoviet of Rubtsovsky District, Altai Krai, Russia. The population was 530 as of 2016. There are 4 streets.

Geography 
Saratovka is located 38 km southeast of Rubtsovsk (the district's administrative centre) by road. Nazarovka is the nearest rural locality.

Ethnicity 
The village is inhabited by Russians, Germans and others.

References 

Rural localities in Rubtsovsky District